Gaza Strip is a 2002 American documentary film by James Longley which records events taking place in 2001 during the Second Intifada.

The film focuses on 13-year-old Mohammed Hejazi, a second-grade dropout the filmmaker encountered at the Karni crossing in the Gaza Strip, where Palestinian children often gather to throw stones. The director has made this film available for free online streaming on the official site, below.

See also
 Death in Gaza, 2004 documentary film

References

External links
 
 
 

2002 films
American documentary films
Films set in the Gaza Strip
Documentary films about the Israeli–Palestinian conflict
2002 documentary films
2000s American films